American Psycho is a conceptual novel by Jason Huff and Mimi Cabell, based on the 1991 novel by Bret Easton Ellis. Huff and Cabell emailed the text of the novel to each other's Gmail accounts one page at a time, collected the contextual advertisements generated for each of those pages, and presented those in book form (published by Traumawien).

The book was part of Erreur d’impression at the Jeu de Paume, Paris in 2012 and received international attention.

References

Further reading

2012 American novels
Conceptual art